China Railway Jinan Group, officially abbreviated as CR Jinan or CR-Jinan, formerly, Jinan Railway Administration is a subsidiaries company under the jurisdiction of the China Railway (formerly the Ministry of Railway). It supervises the railway network within Shandong Province. It is in charge of the railway with total length of 8,283.9 kilometers, and consists of 295 railway stations. The railway administration was reorganized as a company in November 2017.

Hub stations
 Jinan
 Qingdao
 ,

Regional services

C-train services

References

Ministry of Railways of China
Rail transport in Shandong
China Railway Corporation